The National Crime Records Bureau (NCRB) is an Indian government agency responsible for collecting and analyzing crime data as defined by the Indian Penal Code (IPC) and Special and Local Laws (SLL). NCRB is headquartered in New Delhi and is part of the Ministry of Home Affairs (MHA), Government of India. Ramphal Pawar (IPS) is current Director of National Crime Record Bureau.

NCRB was set-up in 1986 to function as a repository of information on crime and criminals so as to assist the investigators in linking crime to the perpetrators. It was set up based on the recommendation of the Task force, 1985 and National Police Commission, 1977 by merging the Directorate of Coordination and Police Computer (DCPC), Inter State Criminals Data Branch of CBI and Central Finger Print Bureau of CBI. Earlier Statistical Branch of Bureau of Police Research and Development (BPR&D) was also merged with NCRB, but was later de-merged.

Mission
To Empower Indian Police with Information Technology and criminal Intelligence to enable them to uphold law and protect people. To provide leadership and excellence in crime analysis particularly for serious and organized crime.

Objectives
 Create and maintain secure sharable National Databases on crimes and criminals for law enforcement agencies and promote their use for public service delivery.
 Collect and process crime statistics at the national level and clearing house of information on crime and criminals both at National and International levels.
 Lead and coordinate development of IT applications and create an enabling IT environment  for Police organizations.
 National repository of fingerprints of all criminals.
 To evaluate, modernize and promote automation in State Crime Records Bureau and State Finger Print Bureau.
 Training and capacity building in Police Forces in Information Technology and Finger Print Science.

Evolution of NCRB

Crime and criminal tracking network and systems  

Crime and Criminal Information System (CCIS) was implemented at district level during the period 1995–2004. Common Integrated Police Application (CIPA) was implemented at  police station level  during the period 2004–2009  in three phases. Crime and Criminal Tracking Network & Systems (CCTNS) is approved by Cabinet Committee on Economic Affairs (CCEA) on 19.06.2009.

Objectives 
 Creating State and Central level databases on crime and criminals.
 Enable easy sharing of real-time information/ intelligence across police stations, districts and States.
 Improved investigation and crime prevention.
 Improved service delivery to the public/ stakeholders through Citizen Portals.

Current Status

Citizen Portal 
Various services as enlisted below are being provided/ proposed to be provided in the Citizen Portals of CCTNS. 
 Filing of Complaints 
 Obtaining the copies of FIRs.
 Obtaining the status of the complaint/ FIR.
 Details of arrested persons/ wanted criminals & their illegal activities.
 Details of missing/ kidnapped persons and their matching with arrested, unidentified persons and dead bodies. 
 Details of stolen/ recovered vehicles, arms and other properties. 
 Verification requests for servants, employment, passport, senior citizen registrations etc. 
 Requests for issue/renewal of various NOCs / Permits/ Clearances
 Portal for sharing information and enabling citizens to down load required forms.

Inter-operable Criminal Justice System (ICJS) 
ICJS has been mandated for integrating CCTNS (Police) with e-Courts, e-prisons, Forensics, Finger Print Bureaux and Prosecution, which are the key components of the Criminal Justice System. Implementation of ICJS will ensure quick data transfer among different pillars of criminal justice system.

Crime records matching 

The main objective of the Crime Records Branch is to collect, collate and disseminate information on Crime, Criminals, Persons and Property for matching purposes. The branch utilizes following software systems:
 VahanSamanvay - An online Motor Vehicle Coordination System for coordination of stolen and recovered motor vehicles across the country. Police, RTOs, and Insurance sector are main stakeholders. The general public is also benefited with this system.
 Talash Information System - This system is used to maintain and coordinate information on Missing, Traced, Unidentified persons and unidentified dead bodies.
 Fake Indian Currency Notes System (FICN) - It is an online system for compilation of fake Indian currency data. Police, Banks, Investigating agencies, other intelligence agencies and Ministries are stakeholders of this system.
 Fire Arms Coordination System - This system is used for coordination of missing/stolen and recovered firearms.
 Colour Portrait Building System - This system is used to create portraits of suspects based on the description given by victims and eyewitnesses.
 Since year 2011, 600 persons (live & dead) have been united with their families by matching photographs and other physical features.
 Since launch of online application "VahanSamanvay" in 2014 till date 14,14,055 data has been captured and 30,577 Stolen vehicles have been matched from different states.

Crime statistics 

NCRB brings out three annual reports i.e. Crime in India, Accidental Deaths & Suicides in India and Prison Statistics India. These reports are principal reference points for police officers, researchers, media & policy makers.

Besides, the Bureau is also collecting Crime Statistics and Anti-human Trafficking statistics on monthly basis. The complete software package of ‘Monthly Crime Statistics’ has been released in the month of December, 2016.

After extensive and exhaustive deliberation with various stakeholders, the proformae for Crime in India, Monthly Crime Statistics and Accidental Deaths & Suicides in India were revised in the year 2014.

NCRB has developed application software for Crime in India (CII), Monthly Crime Statistics (MCS), Accidental Deaths & Suicide in India (ADSI), Prison Statistics of India (PSI). The Bureau is also conducting Training of Trainers (ToT) on Crime in India and Accidental Death & Suicide in India and Prison Statistics India for officials of SCRBx and Prison Departments of States/UTs.

NCRB has been conferred with ‘Digital India Awards 2016’ in open data championship category with Silver on 9 December 2016 for updation of more than 3,000 datasets on Open Government Data (OGD) Platform India in open source format. NCRB has digitised ‘Crime in India’ since 1967 and Accidental Deaths & Suicides in India since 1998. The digitised data have been made available on national data portal https://data.gov.in.

Director, NCRB is designated as National Focal Point for United Nations Surveys on Crime Trends and the Operations of Criminal Justice Systems (UN-CTS). On the behalf of Government of India, NCRB is selected as Member to Technical Advisory Group (TAG) of International Classification of Crime for Statistical Purposes (ICCS).

Central finger print bureau 

The World's First Finger Print Bureau was set up in Calcutta in 1897. A CFPB was established at Shimla in 1905, however it was closed in 1922 as a result of retrenchment proposals of the Inchcape Committee. The Present CFPB came into existence in 1955 under the administrative control of Intelligence Bureau at Delhi. It was relocated to Calcutta (now Kolkata) in 1956. The administrative control of CFPB  shifted to Central Bureau of Investigation (CBI) in 1973, and since July, 1986, this has been under the administrative control of NCRB.

Objectives 
 To maintain Finger Print record slips of the accused person convicted in various Acts. 
 To conduct search relating to unidentified Interstate arrested/suspected persons received from police stations and other investigating agencies in India.
 To maintain the fingerprints of international criminals and red corner notices sent by Interpol and to conduct search on references received from foreign countries, through Interpol.
 To undertake examination of questioned finger impressions on documents received   from Central Government Departments/ Undertakings/Courts of law.
 To impart training in Fingerprint Science to State/Central Police personnel and also to personnel from foreign countries under `Technical Co- Operation Scheme' (TCS) of Colombo Plan, 'Special Commonwealth African Assistance Plan' (SCAAP) and `International Technical and Economic Co-Operation' (ITEC).
 To co-ordinate the work of the State Finger Print Bureaux and give necessary guidance in all matters relating to Fingerprint Science.
 To conduct the All India Conference of Directors of Finger Print Bureaux.
 To conduct All India Board Examination annually for accrediting Finger Print Experts.
 To conduct competition in Finger Print science at the All India Police Duty Meet held annually.

CFPB Evolution

Activities

1.   Automated Finger Print Identification System (AFIS) 
The CFPB has pioneered the automation of fingerprints through its Automated Finger Print Identification System (AFIS) in 1992. This software was jointly developed by NCRB and CMC Ltd. and named as "Fingerprint Analysis & Criminal Tracing System" (FACTS). Currently CFPB is maintaining 10,93,408 Ten Digit Finger Print Record slips of convicted and arrested persons

These Finger Print Slips (Record) and Finger Print Slips (Search) are received from the Finger Print Bureaux of various States/Union Territories and also from the police stations. 

During the calendar 2016, in addition to the above, 151 Search references were also received from Interpol Division of Central Bureau of Investigation (CBI), New Delhi and 1620 slips for record.

CFPB receives number of finger print document cases, from Government departments, courts of law, banks, post offices, investigation agencies etc. for expert opinion.

2.  All India Board Examination of Finger Print Experts 
The All India Board Examination is conducted every year at C.F.P.B. The Board, consists of Director, CFPB as chairman and two technical heads of the State F.P.Bx. as members. CFPB make all arrangements for conducting theory, practical & viva-voce of this examination.

The successful candidates are awarded certificates. Those who secure 1st, 2nd and 3rd places a Cash prize also.

The Aziz ul Haque rolling trophy is also awarded to the topper of the AIBE.

Passing this examination is mandatory to become Finger Print Expert who is competent to give evidence in the Court of Law.

3. Training 
Each year CFPB New Delhi conducts around 5 to 6 training programmes of one week duration for Indian Police Officers in Finger Print Science. Kolkata Unit of CFPB is conducting 18 weeks duration Proficiency course in Finger Print Science twice a year. During the last four years, 266 Indian Police Officers are trained.

Besides CFPB/NCRB also conducts two courses of 12 weeks duration and Four Courses of 8 Weeks duration for Foreign Police Officers under Indian Technical and Economic Cooperation (ITEC) and Special Commonwealth African Assistance Programme (SCAAP) of Ministry of External Affairs. Around 75 foreign officers are being trained every year under this program.  During the last four years, 270 foreign police officers are trained.

Foreign Trainees of 25th Advanced course on IT in Law Enforcement & 21st Advanced Fingerprint Science & IT from (2nd January to 24th March 2017) with Director Dr Ish Kumar and other senior officers of NCRB

4. Publication 
CFPB also compiles data collected from Finger Print Bureaux of States/UT on standard Annual Statistics Report format, and publishes the -Finger Print in India since 1997. This is the principal resource document for all concerned.

5. All India Conference of Directors of Finger Print Bureaux 
The All India Conference of Directors of Finger Print Bureaux of States/UTs, is an annual conference as mandated by the MHA. It is being held annually by CFPB (NCRB) to deliberate on recent trends in the field of finger print science and other priority issues concerning finger print fraternity of the nation. This conference was started in the year 1980 at New Delhi and is being hosted at different locations in the Country. It is completely funded by the Government of India. The 18th  edition of the conference is being held at HPA, Madhuban, Haryana on 30 and 31 March 2017.

Competition "Award of Excellence" is conducted   to identify an excellent work performed by FP Experts in States/UTs and three cash rewards of Rs.10,000/=, Rs.7,500/=, Rs.5000/= are given during the conference.

6.  All India Board Police Duty Meet 
CFPB is participating in All India Police Duty Meet (AIPDM) for conducting Finger Print Test to judge the acumen and knowledge of participating police personnel in the field.

Some Success Stories 
1. The Interpol had requested CFPB to compare finger print and demographic details of BARRIOS GUARIN Jose Mauricio with existing records in connection with Identification of an International Fugitive wanted for Homicide in Colombia (South America) vide Ref. No. 203/2010F.  It was ascertained that the fingerprint of BARRIOS GUARIN Jose Mauricio was IDENTICAL with the Right Index (RI) finger impression present on the specimen 10-digit F.P. slip of MAITA RODRIGUEZ Perd Alejandro, hence the two finger prints were found to be of one and the same person.

2. A fingerprint slip pertaining to one Singh Iqbal was forwarded by Interpol for record purpose. This slip was processed in FACTS (CFPB-AFIS) and was found to be a ‘trace’ against a record slip archived with CFPB PIN 604744. The successful search brought to light the criminal antecedents of the subjected person, who was convicted in pursuance of criminal case registered vide FIR No. 34 dated 24.09.1996 in the court of SDJM, Nabha on 20.09.2000 U/s 324/34 IPC

3. Interpol search slip from New Zealand Police vide Case Reference No. A&SP/New Zealand/FP /2016/454 Dt. 12-02-2016 was traced against the F.P. slip bearing PID No. 90474919 present in CFPB data base, of one Arvinder Pal Singh S/o Malkeet Singh R/o H. No. 53, Professor Enclave, opposite Punjabi University, Patiala, Punjab.

4. The NIA suspected that N.Shanti Metei chief of PREPAK (UPPK), a banned terrorist organization active in anti-national activities was using forged documents, and false identities, Thorough comparison of the fingerprints of T. Hemanta Sharma on land agreements, sale deeds etc., and specimen fingerprints of N.Shanti Metei, proved that N. Shanti Metei used a pseudonym for illegal purchases.

5. The Ordnance Factory, Ministry of Defence, Raipur, Dehradun, Uttarakhand, doubted the authenticity of the final list of 54-candidates selected through written and trade tests conducted by them. The CFPB compared the finger prints of all provisionally selected candidates, After thorough examination, the expert in the Bureau was able to discern, that in three cases the finger impressions were different, from one another, indicating impersonation on the part of the candidates.

6. Document case received from Dy. Director of Income Tax (inv.) relating to a search and seizure operation u/s 132 of the Income Tax Act 1961 in a case of M/s National Enterprises and Group and recovered some documents.. The documents consisted of 1536 pages with eight to twelve thumb prints on each page (i.e. over 12000 prints in total). After examination of the document, CFPB experts were able to establish that all the prints were given by 8 to 10 fingers only indicating fraudulent payment of approximately 2.25 crores. Approximately 40% finger impressions were faint, blurred or partial.

7. A total of fifty five (55) fingerprint slips for establishing identity were received in FACTS (CFPB-AFIS) from Uttarakhand State police Department. The slips carried fingerprints of Unidentified Dead Bodies (UDBs). Majority of fingerprints were faint, smudged, or partial. All the slips required additional computer based enhancement efforts to make them decipherable for comparison by the system. Out of the 55 slips, one unidentified dead body fingerprint slip matched with the slip of one Jamil S/o. Mustaq of P.S. Kithore, Meerut, U.P. The successful input of UDB Fingerprint slip (CFPB PIN No. 90440105) followed by trace with slip bearing PIN 90423149, revealed the antecedents of the subjected person - Jamil was convicted in pursuance of criminal case registered vide FIR No. 60 dated 19-03-2013 U/S 363 IPC of ODRS police station.

Training branch 

Each year Training branch conducts on an average 20-25 training programmes for Indian Police Officers of the duration of 1 week on the subjects like CCTNS, Advanced Fingerprint Science, Network & e-Security etc. NCRB also conducts the courses on "Training of Trainers" for development of training resource persons in subjects like Basic Crime Analysis, Windows 2000 & SQL Server, Network & e-Security, Linux and CCTNS.

NCRB also conducts two courses of 12 weeks duration and four courses of 8 weeks duration for Foreign Police Officers under Indian Technical and Economic Cooperation (ITEC) and Special Commonwealth African Assistance Programme (SCAAP) of Ministry of External Affairs. Different programmes viz., Cyber Crime & Network Security, Advanced Fingerprint Science, IT in Law Enforcement, Advanced Course on IT in Law Enforcement and Advanced Fingerprint Science and IT are conducted for these officers. Every year, on an average more than 125 officers from 20 to 25 countries from Latin America, Africa, South Asia and Middle East attend these programmes. Special Training Programmes have been conducted for Afghanistan & Mongolian Police Officers on Fingerprint Science.

Regional Police Computer Training Centre (RPCTC) 
Four RPCTCs in Hyderabad, Gandhi Nagar, Lucknow and Kolkata conduct similar courses for lower functionaries of Indian Police. NCRB provides funds to these centres for faculty, stationery, training material and infrastructure including computer hardware, software etc.

Training

Revelations from Crime Statistics 
The NCRB data 2020 brought out glaring statistics that pointed out married men committed more suicide due to family problems. The statistics went further to point out that one man commits suicide every 5 minutes. 

The Crime Records also pointed out a very pertinent fact that over 74% of rape cases and 80% dowry cases filed in India end in acquittal which suggest there is a growing trend of false cases being filed by women against men to meet their needs and use the Gender Biased Laws to their favor. Interpreting the statistics and also drawing inference from the own lessons, Delhi High Court pointed out that there is an alarming rise in false rape cases in India and this must be checked at the earliest.

News Letter 
A quarterly publication named NCRB New Letter is also compiled and published by the Training Branch and circulated to the police fraternity to make them aware about NCRB achievements/activities.

See also

 Crime reporting and tracking
 Bureau of Police Research and Development (BPRD)
 Call 112
 Criminal record
 Crime and Criminal Tracking Network and Systems (CCTNS)
 Law enforcement in India
 Sex offender registry (SOR)
 United Nations Office on Drugs and Crime (UNODC)
 Other police related
 Indian Police Foundation and Institute
 Sardar Vallabhbhai Patel National Police Academy

References

External links
 Prison Statistics India 2015
 NCRB website
 Crime in India 2012 Statistics

Federal law enforcement agencies of India
New Delhi